The 2020 Florida Gators softball team represents the University of Florida in the 2020 NCAA Division I softball season. The Gators play their home games at Katie Seashole Pressly Softball Stadium.

Previous season

The Gators finished the 2019 season 49–18 overall, and 12–12 in the SEC to finish in a tie for sixth in the conference. The Gators hosted a Regional and Super Regional during the  2019 NCAA Division I softball tournament and later advanced to the Women's College World Series. The Gators went 0–2 in the WCWS.

Preseason

SEC preseason poll
The SEC preseason poll was released on January 15, 2020.

Schedule and results

Source:
*Rankings are based on the team's current ranking in the NFCA poll.

Rankings

References

Florida
Florida Gators softball seasons
Florida Gators softball